Otilio Warrington, known popularly as Bizcocho (born February 26, 1944) is a comedian, best known for his roles of "Bizcocho" and "Cuca Gómez".

Early years
Warrington was born in the Barrio Obrero area of Santurce, Puerto Rico. When he was nine years old, his family moved to the Lloréns Torres public housing project.  There he lived for the next 25 years.  Warrington left school when he was a teenager and made a living by polishing shoes at a local barbershop.  One of the barbershop's regular customers was Tommy Muñiz, a television show producer.  One day Warrington asked Muñiz for a job in television but was told to get some more education and come back to him after he graduated.

Bizcocho
Encouraged by Mr. Muñiz's challenge, Warrington returned to school and graduated from San Juan's Central High School in 1960; he then went back to Mr. Muñiz to take him up on his earlier offer. Tommy Muñiz kept his word and let Otilio assist in the TV show "El Special de Corona" (The Corona Special).  Thus, Warrington became the "first" black Puerto Rican male comedian to be regularly featured on a local TV program. One of the show's sections involved a group of "wacky" soldiers and included José Miguel Agrelot and Jacobo Morales.  When Otilio joined the group, Morales baptized him as "Soldier Bizcocho" (Cake), a nickname that would remain with him for the rest of his life.

Muñiz saw potential in Otilio and paid for his college education; as a result Warrington attended the University of Puerto Rico graduating with an associate degree in Television Direction and Production. After graduation Otilio participated in many local TV programs such as: "Ja ja ji ji jo jo con Agrelot" and "El Show del Mediodía" (The Noon Show).

Warrington joined ASTRA productions in the 1970s and after working for different shows landed a spot in " Cogiendo Impulso", which was transmitted on Channel 11; it was here that he developed the characters of "Juancito" and "Pito".  In (1979) he participated in the movie production of Jacobo Morales' Díos los Cría (And God raised them) alongside Norma Candal, Gladys Rodríguez, Esther Sandoval and Alicia Moreda.

Cuca Gómez
Later, in the early 1980's, while working in the comedy Kakukómicos, Warrington developed the character of "Cuca Gómez", a cross-dressing role that would help settle Warrington's fame as a comedian.  The plot involved a female cosmetologist who was involved in all kinds of hilarious and off-the-wall situations.  "Cuca Gómez" became very popular in Puerto Rico and soon appeared in other TV shows as a special guest star.  In 1985, Warrington was named "Mr. Television" by the Artistic Association of Puerto Rico.

Music
In 1986, Pijuán, a Puerto Rican musician, in conjunction with Bizcocho created an album called Bizcocho & Pijuán "El premio 'Gordo' del Sabor", under Private Ranch Records.

Later years
In the 1990s, Warrington starred in his own TV show, Mi Familia (My Family), where he acted as "Arcadio".  He also worked in El Show de las 12 (The 12 o'clock Show) acting as "Don Ambrosio" and "Yeyito".

Other shows
Among the shows which Warrington has hosted are Friendo y Comiendo alongside Luis Antonio Cosme, Café con Leche alongside Lily García and Yan Ruíz and a television program transmitted through WAPA-TV called La Cocina Caliente de Luis y Bizcocho (Luis and Bizcocho's Hot Kitchen), alongside Luisito Vigoreaux; Hola Gente alongside Alexandra Fuentes and Gerardo Ortiz; and together with Lily and Yan a morning show called "¡Buenos Días!" (Good Morning!)

Health problems
Warrington had vesicular surgery during 2017, after it was discovered, during a visit to an emergency room, that he had stones inside that organ.

See also

 List of Puerto Ricans
 Black history in Puerto Rico
 Pijuan

References

External links
  La Comedia

1944 births
Living people
Puerto Rican comedians
People from Santurce, Puerto Rico